Caroline Linda Margaret Waldegrave (née Burrows), Baroness Waldegrave of North Hill, OBE (born 14 August 1952) is managing director of Leiths School of Food and Wine, which she jointly bought with former British Telecom Chairman and Chairman of the Royal Shakespeare Company, Sir Christopher Bland, in 1994.

Education
Lady Waldegrave was educated at Woldingham School, a Roman Catholic boarding independent school for girls, near the village of Woldingham in Surrey.

Life and career
Waldegrave was principal of Leiths from 1975 to 2002. She has also co-written several cookery books (titles include Leiths Cookery Bible, Leiths Cooking for One or Two, Leiths Easy Dinner Parties, Leiths Seasonal Bible).

Family
Since 1975 she has been married to William Waldegrave, former Conservative politician who served in the Cabinet from 1990 until 1997, and then became a life peer.  They have four children: Katie, Liza, Jamie and Harriet.

References

1952 births
Living people
People from Mendip District
People from Somerset
English businesspeople
British baronesses
Officers of the Order of the British Empire
English food writers
Place of birth missing (living people)
People educated at Woldingham School
Women cookbook writers
English women non-fiction writers
Spouses of life peers